The by-thirds 2015 Slough Borough Council election took place on 7 May 2015 to elect approximately one third of the members of Slough Borough Council in England to coincide with other local elections, an election which was held simultaneously with the 2015 General Election, resulting in higher turnout than the previous election.

Results
The Labour party won 10 of the 14 seats contested, losing one to the Conservative Party who held two and made a second gain, which was at the expense of the only UKIP incumbent councillor whose seat was up for election, leaving UKIP with one councillor.

In parties without seats, Liberal Democrats secured fourth place in the four wards in which they stood, thus no seats, and the other two candidates shown in the table below won less than 6% of the vote in their multi-choice respective wards, Cippenham Green and Langley St Mary's, to finish fourth and fifth respectively, obtaining the fewest votes in those wards.

Ward results

References

2015 English local elections
May 2015 events in the United Kingdom
2015
2010s in Berkshire